Endocrine Research is a peer-reviewed medical journal that covers endocrinology in the broadest context. Subjects of interest include: receptors and mechanism of action of hormones, methodological advances in the detection and measurement of hormones; structure and chemical properties of hormones.

Editor 
The editor in chief of Endocrine Research is Michael Katz (San Antonio, Texas).

References 

Endocrinology journals
Publications established in 1979